Bill Guffey (born January 21, 1943) is an American politician from Cheyenne, Wyoming who served in the Wyoming House of Representatives from 1977 to 1979, representing Laramie County as a Democrat in the 44th Wyoming Legislature.

Early life and education
Guffey was born in Twin Falls, Idaho on January 21, 1943. He attended George Washington University.

Career
In 1977, Guffey was elected to the Wyoming House of Representatives to represent Laramie County as a Democrat until 1979. During his time in office, Guffey served on the standing committee of Corporations, Elections and Political Subdivisions.

Personal life
Guffey is married and has two children.

Notes

References

External links
Official page at the Wyoming Legislature

1943 births
Living people
20th-century American politicians
Democratic Party members of the Wyoming House of Representatives
George Washington University alumni
People from Twin Falls, Idaho